Steven Roger Terreberry (born September 30, 1987), also known as Stevie T, is a Canadian YouTuber and musician based in Welland, Ontario. He is known for his comedic videos involving music.

Career
Terreberry created his YouTube channel on January 7, 2008. His first video was a guitar cover of "When the Saints Go Marching In". He began to gain popularity on the site in 2011. 

In 2014, Terreberry signed on with music label Artery Recordings. Terreberry's debut album, Album of Epicness, was released in 2015 with the lead single "Djenstrumental". He also collaborated with Jarrod Alonge on his 2015 project Beating a Dead Horse. 

In 2019, Terreberry started a competition with Jared Dines to play the guitar with the most strings. The competition ended after Terreberry received a custom 20-string guitar. Terreberry and Dines later sold their instruments for charity. That year, Terreberry was invited to tour with DragonForce as a replacement for bassist Frédéric Leclercq. Initially agreeing to the tour, Terreberry swiftly dropped out due to anxiety attacks. Afterwards, he was given a cameo appearance in the music video for the song "Razorblade Meltdown".

On May 7, 2021, Terreberry's YouTube channel was hacked, resulting in all of his videos being set to private, as well as his channel's name and photo being changed. The hacker was identified as a Binance employee impersonator. During the hack, a livestream involving Binance was public on his channel until it was terminated shortly after a mass report. When Terreberry's channel was recovered, the livestream was removed, and his channel's name and photo were reset. Three days later, all of his videos were reset to public.

On March 30, 2022, Terreberry played a guitar solo on stage with DragonForce during the band's live show in Toronto.

Discography

Albums

Non-album singles 
List adapted from TIDAL on December 16, 2022.

 "Metalcore Song" 2013
 "Online Lover" 2014
 "Super Mario Bros. Djent" 2014
 "Man Bun Song" 2016
 "Halloween Core" 2016
 "Negative Comments Song" 2016
 "Shredding National Anthems" 2017
 "Yu-Gi-Oh! Guitar Battle" 2017
 "Uku-Djent" 2017
 "Another Brick in the Wall, Pt. 2 (In Major)" 2017
 "Fidget Spinner Metal" 2017
 "Breakdown" (Tom Petty and the Heartbreakers cover) 2017
 "Life in Virtual" 2018
 "Canada Bumps" 2018
 "Jurassic Park Guitar Cover" 2018
 "Acoustipop" 2020
 "Jojo" ("In Managua" cover) 2020
 "Punk Rock God" 2020
 "Song Using ALL of My Guitars" 2020
 "Somebody's Watching Me METAL" (featuring Anthony Vincent) 2021
 "Cowboy Boots & Beers" 2022
 "Rebounding" (featuring Anthony Vincent) 2022
 "Subliminal Tie" (featuring Tokyo Speirs) 2022
 "Stand Up" (Papa Roach cover) (featuring Anthony Vincent & Joey Izzo) 2022 
 "Knipslot" 2022

Other appearances

Footnotes

References

Canadian YouTubers
Canadian comedy musicians
Canadian heavy metal musicians
1987 births
Living people
Music YouTubers
Comedy YouTubers
Canadian Internet celebrities